The 2010 WNBA Playoffs is the postseason for the Women's National Basketball Association's 2010 season.

Format
The top 4 teams from each conference qualify for the playoffs.
All 4 teams are seeded by basis of their standings.
The series for rounds one and two are in a best-of-three format with Games 1 and 3 on the home court of the team with the higher seed. In previous years, the higher seed would play the first game on the road, then games 2 and (if needed) 3 at home.
The series for the WNBA Finals is in a best-of-five format with Games 1, 2 and 5 on the home court of the team with the higher seed.

Tiebreak procedures

Two-team tie
 Better record in head-to-head games.
 Better winning percentage within own conference.
 Better winning percentage against all teams with .500 or better record at the end of the season.
 Better point differential in games head-to-head.
 Coin toss.

Three or more-team tie
 Better winning percentage among all head-to-head games involving tied teams.
 Better winning percentage against teams within conference (for first two rounds of playoffs) or better record against teams in the opposite conference (for Finals).
 Better winning percentage against all teams with a .500 or better record at the end of the season.
 Better point differential in games involving tied teams.
 Coin toss.

Playoff qualifying

Eastern Conference

Western Conference

Bracket
Note: italics denote home-court advantage; bold denotes series winner.

Eastern Conference

Conference semifinals

(1) Washington Mystics vs. (4) Atlanta Dream

Regular-season series
The Washington Mystics won 3–1 in the regular-season series:

(2) New York Liberty vs. (3) Indiana Fever

Regular-season series
The teams were tied 2–2 in the regular-season series:

Conference finals

(2) New York Liberty vs. (4) Atlanta Dream

Regular-season series
The teams were tied 2–2 in the regular season series

Western Conference

Conference semifinals

(1) Seattle Storm vs. (4) Los Angeles Sparks

Regular-season series
The Seattle Storm won 5–0 in the regular-season series:

(2) Phoenix Mercury vs. (3) San Antonio Silver Stars

Regular-season series
The teams were tied 2–2 in the regular-season series:

Conference finals

(1) Seattle Storm vs. (2) Phoenix Mercury

Regular-season series
The Seattle Storm won 5–0 in the regular-season series:

WNBA Finals

Seattle Storm vs. Atlanta Dream

Regular-season series
The Seattle Storm won 2–0 in the regular-season series:

References

Playoffs
Women's National Basketball Association Playoffs